Daniel Ciugureanu Cabinet was the Cabinet of Moldova (16 January 1918 – 8 April 1918). 

It was the second cabinet of the Moldavian Democratic Republic.

Membership of the Cabinet 

Daniel Ciugureanu, President of the Council
Ion Pelivan, Minister of Foreign Affairs
Vladimir Cristi, Minister of Internal Affairs
Constantin Brăescu, Minister of War
Mihail Savenco, Minister of Justice
Teofil Ioncu, Minister of Finance
Pantelimon Erhan, Minister of Public Instruction
Nicolae Bosie-Codreanu, Minister of Communications
Veniamin I. Grinfeld, Minister of Industry and Commerce
Anton Crihan, Minister of Agriculture
Vladislov Podwinsky, the State Controller of Bessarabia

Notes
 

 

 

Moldova cabinets
1918 establishments in Romania
1918 disestablishments in Romania
Cabinets established in 1918
Cabinets disestablished in 1918